Baréty may refer to:

People with the surname
Alexandre Baréty (1844–1918), French physician
Jean-Paul Baréty (1928–2018), French politician
Léon Baréty (1883–1971), French politician

Places
Palais Baréty, historic building in France